Butch is Not a Dirty Word (BINADW) is an Australian biannual magazine for butch lesbians and their supporters, the only magazine in the world specifically dedicated to gender nonconforming women. The magazine's motto is "A queer magazine for butch dykes, butch lesbians, butch women, trans butches, non-binary butches & all those who love them."

History
The magazine was founded in Melbourne, Australia, in March 2017 as a not-for-profit project dedicated to butch lesbians and "masculine-of-center" women in Australia and throughout the world. The magazine is edited by pro-skateboarder Esther Godoy and was inspired by the San Francisco photographer Meg Allen's photo series "Butch". Godoy has said her experience of immigrating from Melbourne to Portland, Oregon, helped inspire her to create the magazine, because it was in Portland that she first felt accepted as a butch lesbian. The magazine aims to reclaim the word "butch", provide more positive representation for butch lesbians and masculine-presenting women, and expand the butch lesbian community in Australia.

Godoy has stated that the purpose of Butch Is Not A Dirty Word is about:breaking up the ideal that masculinity and femininity have to belong to male or female. Female masculinity is just as valid as male masculinity. It’s not really bound to your sex or gender. Yet it’s surprising how much of a taboo it still is, when you look like a guy but you’re a girl.BINADW aims to combat lesbian invisibility and dispel the lesbophobic and ageist "old butch dyke" trope that associates being butch with "aggression, ugliness, and loneliness."

Among the many issues that BINADW explores is ageism within lesbian communities. The third issue of the magazine was "dedicated to exploring the experiences and perspectives of Butches of all ages" to acknowledge and honor "the road that our Butch Elders have paved for us, and how their contributions have created a safer space for queers to exist and thrive."

BINADW contributors include Jewel Robinson, Leah Peterson, and Avery Everhart.

See also
 Lesbian literature
 List of lesbian periodicals

References

External links
Official BINADW website
Official BINADW Instagram account
Website for Meg Allen's "Butch" 
Butches Against the Patriarchy podcast about BINADW 

2017 establishments in Australia
2010s LGBT literature
Women's magazines published in Australia
Butch and femme
Lesbian culture in Oregon
Lesbian-related magazines
LGBT culture in Portland, Oregon
LGBT literature in Australia
Magazines established in 2017
Magazines published in Melbourne
Non-profit organisations based in Australia
Queer magazines
Queer women's culture
Transgender literature
Trans women